POLAR III is a pedestrian test dummy created by Honda.

The dummy is used to study how pedestrians are injured or killed when hit by automobiles. POLAR III has instruments to measure the level of injury throughout the body.

About 5,000 pedestrians are killed in traffic accidents each year in the United States.  By studying test dummy results and designing cars in such a way as to protect pedestrians as much as possible in the event of a collision, the number of fatalities and injuries due to pedestrians being struck may be reduced.

See also
 Crash test dummy
 Pedestrian safety through vehicle design

References
 POLAR III
 Cross member
 National Geographic Magazine, July 2005

Vehicle safety technologies
Automotive safety
Pedestrian safety